Aleksandar Aranđelović 18 December 1920 – 8 September 1999) was a Yugoslavian football player and coach. As a player, Aranđelović played professionally as a striker in Yugoslavia, Italy, France and Spain between 1938 and 1953. As a coach, Aranđelović was active in Canada and Australia.

Career

Playing career
Born in Crna Trava, Aranđelović joined the youth team of Jedinstvo Beograd in 1932, making his senior debut in 1938. He also played in Yugoslavia for Prva Armija, Metalac Beograd, Student Beograd and Red Star Belgrade, in Italy for AC Milan, Padova, AS Roma and Novara, in France for Racing Paris and in Spain for Atlético Madrid.

With Padova he was part of the team that won the 1947–48 Serie B Girone B, earning promotion to Serie A. He played in the Serie A with Padova, AS Roma and Novara until 1951, making a total of 46 Serie A appearances, scoring 20 goals.

Coaching career
Aranđelović later became a football coach in Canada and Australia. In Australia he managed the South Australian state team in 1963.

References

External links
RSSSF - "Apolides" in Italy
Weltfußball.de  
 Nisu vam pričali o Aci Autobusu

1920 births
1999 deaths
Serbian footballers
Yugoslav footballers
SK Jedinstvo Beograd players
Red Star Belgrade footballers
OFK Beograd players
Yugoslav First League players
Serie A players
A.C. Milan players
Calcio Padova players
A.S. Roma players
Novara F.C. players
Ligue 1 players
Racing Club de France Football players
La Liga players
Atlético Madrid footballers
Expatriate footballers in Italy
Expatriate footballers in France
Expatriate footballers in Spain
Serbian expatriate footballers
Association football forwards